Rocco Marconi (born before 1490 – 13 May 1529) was an Italian painter of the Renaissance period, active mainly in Venice and Treviso. He was a pupil of the painter Giovanni Bellini along with Vittore Belliniano and Girolamo Santacroce. His first wife died in 1511. He is known to have joined the Venetian painters' guild (fraglia) in 1517, and the Scuola di Sant’Anna in 1526.

References

 Giovanni Bellini and Rocco Marconi, by Felton Gibbons The Art Bulletin (1962) 127-131

1529 deaths
15th-century Italian painters
Italian male painters
16th-century Italian painters
Painters from Venice
Italian Renaissance painters
Year of birth uncertain